Dangerous World is Hong Kong Mandopop artist Khalil Fong's Mandarin album. It was released on April 11, 2014. The first song he introduced was the English single Lights Up which he performed at concerts in late 2013. He described it as "hip-hop infused", "old school", and "bit harder-hitting."

Track listing

Music videos

References

External links
 Dangerous World
 Khalil Fong Website

2014 albums
Khalil Fong albums